Tamri is a small town and rural commune in Agadir-Ida Ou Tanane Prefecture, Souss-Massa, Morocco. At the time of the 2004 census, the commune had a total population of 17,442 people living in 2927 households.

References

Populated places in Agadir-Ida Ou Tanane Prefecture
Rural communes of Souss-Massa